Ida Maria Marja Lahti (3 December 1901, Kymi – 19 April 1967) was a Finnish politician who served as Deputy Minister of Agriculture in the Virolainen Cabinet.

Lahti worked for a small farmers' federation in her local area, before being elected to the Parliament of Finland for the Agrarian League at the 1954 general election. She remained a member until her death. In parliament she served on the Economic Committee, the Grand Committee and the Banking Committee. From 1964 to 1966 she served as second minister of Agriculture in the cabinet of Johannes Virolainen.

References

1901 births
1967 deaths
People from Kotka
People from Viipuri Province (Grand Duchy of Finland)
Centre Party (Finland) politicians
Ministers of Agriculture of Finland
Members of the Parliament of Finland (1954–58)
Members of the Parliament of Finland (1958–62)
Members of the Parliament of Finland (1962–66)
Members of the Parliament of Finland (1966–70)
Women government ministers of Finland
20th-century Finnish women politicians
Women members of the Parliament of Finland